"Country Girl" is a song by Scottish rock band Primal Scream. It was released as a single on 22 May 2006 and was the first single issued from the band's eighth album, Riot City Blues (2006). It became the band's highest-charting in the United Kingdom as well as their first UK top-five entry and their third top-10 single. In the band's native Scotland, the song reached number three on the Scottish Singles Chart, becoming their most successful single since "Kowalski" in 1997. "Country Girl" was released to American radio on 24 July 2006.

The song was frequently used by ITV during their coverage of the 2006 FIFA World Cup, alongside the Kasabian cover version of David Bowie's "'Heroes'" and "Valerie" by the Zutons. It also features as the theme tune of The Janice Long Review Show. "Country Girl" was covered by Irish actress Jessie Buckley for the 2019 country music drama film Wild Rose.

Music video
The girl featured in the video (played by Helena Mattsson) is inspired by Baby (played by Sheri Moon) from Rob Zombie's House of 1000 Corpses / The Devil's Rejects. The music video was directed by Jonas Åkerlund.

Track listings
UK CD single
 "Country Girl"
 "Stone Ya to the Bone"
 "Gimme Some Truth"
 "Country Girl" (video)

UK 7-inch single
A. "Country Girl" – 4:33
B. "Gimme Some Truth" (written by John Lennon)

European CD single
 "Country Girl"
 "To Live Is to Fly" (written by Townes Van Zandt)

Charts

Weekly charts

Year-end charts

Certifications

Release history

References

2006 singles
2006 songs
Columbia Records singles
Music videos directed by Jonas Åkerlund
Primal Scream songs
Songs written by Andrew Innes
Songs written by Bobby Gillespie
Songs written by Mani (musician)
Songs written by Martin Duffy (musician)